Mabel Walker may refer to:

Mabel Walker (athlete) (born 1928), American sprinter
Mabel Walker (suffragist) (1902–1987), American-Bahamian suffragist
Mabel Walker Willebrandt (1889–1963), American politician